is a Japanese footballer, currently playing for Ehime FC in J3 League, on loan from Thespakusatsu Gunma.

Career
Shumpei Fukahori joined J2 League club Nagoya Grampus in 2017.

On 24 January 2019, Fukahori joined Vitória de Guimarães on loan until 31 July 2019.

Career statistics

Club
.

References

External links
Profile at Nagoya Grampus

Official Twitter account

1998 births
Living people
People from Nagakute, Aichi
Association football people from Aichi Prefecture
Japanese footballers
Japanese expatriate footballers
J1 League players
J2 League players
J3 League players
Liga Portugal 2 players
Nagoya Grampus players
Vitória S.C. B players
Mito HollyHock players
FC Gifu players
Thespakusatsu Gunma players
Association football midfielders
Japanese expatriate sportspeople in Portugal
Expatriate footballers in Portugal